Abdallah bin Alawi was the Sultan (?Shirazi) of and on Anjouan island (in the Comoros) from 1816 to 1832, and then again from 1833 to his death in 1836. He was succeeded first by Ali bin Salim, and finally by Saidi Alawi bin Abdallah.

References

1836 deaths
Year of birth missing
Sultans of Anjouan